The National Party ( al-Ḥizb al-Waṭanī) was a Syrian political party founded in 1947, eventually dissolving in 1963, after the Syrian Ba'ath Party established one-party rule in Syria in a coup d'état. It grew out of the National Bloc, which opposed the Ottomans in Syria, and later demanded independence from the French mandate. The party saw the greatest support among the Damascene old guard and industrialists. It supported closer ties with the Arab countries and territories to Syria's south, mainly Saudi Arabia, Egypt, Lebanon, and Mandatory Palestine, although it began supporting Hashemite-ruled Iraq and Jordan starting in 1949 amongst growing public support. While the dominant party in 1940s and early 1950s, it was replaced by its rival, the People's Party, thereafter. Similar to the People's Party, the National Party was also supported by landowners and landlords.

In 1936, leaders of the National Bloc (Hashim al-Atassi, Saadallah al-Jabiri, Lutfi al-Haffar, Jamil Mardam Bey, Shukri al-Quwatli, Nasib al-Bakri, Ibrahim Hananu, Sultan Basha al-Atrash, Faris al-Khoury, Saleh al-Ali, Faisal Najib, Honorary Sami Al Baroudi and Mohamed Alomar) sent a delegation to France demanding independence. The delegation was headed by Hashim Atassi and included Saadallah al-Jabiri, Faris al-Khoury, Jamil Mardam Bey, Ministers Odmon Humusi and Amir Naim Mustafa al-Shihabi with Antioch as General Secretary.

A new political movement with the same name, but no direct connection to the historical National Party, was established in 2005 in support of the Bashar Al-Assad regime. The party grew in popularity because of increased use of internet communication.

References

Bibliography

1948 establishments in Syria
1963 disestablishments in Syria
Arab nationalism in Syria
Arab nationalist political parties
Conservative parties in Asia
Defunct conservative parties
Defunct nationalist parties
Defunct political parties in Syria
National conservative parties
Nationalist parties in Syria
Political parties disestablished in 1963
Political parties established in 1947
Republican parties
Republicanism in the Arab world
Syrian nationalism